Nguyễn Thị Thanh Hòa (born 3 November 1954, in Tiên Du District, Bắc Ninh Province) is a Vietnamese politician. She was a member of the 10th and 11th Central Committee and is a member of the National Assembly (Vietnam). She is currently the President of the Vietnam Women's Union (2007–).

References

1954 births
Living people
Members of the National Assembly (Vietnam)
People from Bắc Ninh province
Members of the 10th Central Committee of the Communist Party of Vietnam
Members of the 11th Central Committee of the Communist Party of Vietnam